The Association Sportive Dumbea is a handball club in New Caledonia.

Records

Men
 Oceania Handball Champions Cup - 2 titles
Winners - 2008, 2010 
Runners-up - 2006
Third - 2007, 2009, 2015

Women
 Oceania Women's Handball Champions Cup
Winners - 2017
Runners-up - 2010

 Australian Handball Club Championship
Winners - 2017

See also
 Oceania Handball Champions Cup
 Oceania Women's Handball Champions Cup

References

 Female team picture
 Photos vs Sydney University, 2015
 Sydney Uni win Oceania championships, off to the World Cup and a Europe Tour
 Four Oceania teams compete for IHF Super Globe ticket. International handball federation webpage

External links
 Profile on New Caledonia Federation official webpage (French)
 FFHB Ligue De Handball Nouvelle Caledonie (French)
 Oceania Continent Handball Federation

Handball clubs
Oceania Handball Clubs
Sport in New Caledonia